Ifeanyichukwu Eddie Mbadiwe (born 6 February 1942) is a Nigerian politician who served as People's Democratic Party member of the House of Representatives for Ideato North/South in Imo State.

He was educated at Government Secondary School at Owerri, the University of Ibadan (BSc, 1966) and the University of East Anglia (PhD, 1975).

References

1942 births
Living people
University of Ibadan alumni
Alumni of the University of East Anglia
Members of the House of Representatives (Nigeria)
Peoples Democratic Party members of the House of Representatives (Nigeria)